Peter Miles (April 1, 1938 – August 3, 2002) was the stage name of American child actor Gerald Richard Perreau-Saussine. After his film career ended, he turned to writing under the pen name Richard Miles.

Early life
Born in Tokyo, Miles was the son of Eleanor Alfrida (Child) and Robert Henri Perreau-Saussine, and the older brother of actresses Gigi, Janine, and Lauren Perreau. He was educated at Beverly Hills Catholic School and graduated from Loyola High School in Los Angeles, California.

Acting career
His first screen appearance was as the uncredited son of Humphrey Bogart's character in Passage to Marseille (1944). Other notable film credits include Enchantment (1948), The Red Pony (1949), and Quo Vadis (1951).

With then began appearing on television, guest starring in episodes of Father Knows Best, The Lone Ranger, and 77 Sunset Strip, among others, and he was a regular on The Betty Hutton Show with his sister, Gigi Perreau, for a year. In 1959, he guest-starred (under the name "Richard Miles") on Perry Mason as defendant Jimmy Morrow in "The Case of the Spanish Cross" and in 1962 on Straightaway as Vernon in the episode "The Drag Strip."

Post-acting career
As Richard Miles, he wrote novels, poetry, and two screenplays. In 1963, he entered his first novel, That Cold Day in the Park, in a Dell Publishing contest; it did not win, but was considered worthy of publication (in 1965); it was made into a film of the same name in 1969. Samuel Goldwyn and his wife personally presented him with the Samuel Goldwyn Writing Award for his novel Angel Loves Nobody, while he was attending UCLA. His third novel was The Moonbathers.

He was also a schoolteacher and president of the Burbank Teachers Association.

In the art world, he compiled catalogs of works of various artists and curated shows from the 1980s to 2001.

Death
Miles died of cancer in Los Angeles. He was survived by his mother, sisters Gigi, Janine and Lauren, and his partner Brian Quarch.

Complete filmography

As actor
 Passage to Marseille (1944) as Jean Matrac Jr. (uncredited)
 San Diego, I Love You (1944) as Joel McCooley (credited as Gerald Perreau)
 Dark Waters (1944) (uncredited)
 Hi, Beautiful (1944) as Boy (uncredited)
 The Clock (1945) as Boy in Station (uncredited)
 Abbott and Costello in Hollywood (1945) as Little Boy with Horn (uncredited)
 This Love of Ours (1945) as Child (uncredited)
 Yolanda and the Thief (1945) as Little Boy (uncredited)
 Possessed (1947) as Wynn Graham (as Gerald Perreau)
 Curley (1947) as Dudley aka Dud (as Gerald Perreau)
 The Hal Roach Comedy Carnival (1947) as Dud, in 'Curly' (as Gerald Perreau)
 Heaven Only Knows (1947) as Speck O'Donnell
 Who Killed Doc Robbin (1948) as Dudley (as Gerald Perreau)
 Family Honeymoon (1948) as Abner
 Enchantment (1948) as Rollo, as a Child
 The Red Pony (1949) as Tom
 Special Agent (1949) as Jake Rumpler Jr
 Roseanna McCoy (1949) as Little Randall McCoy
 Song of Surrender (1949) as Simon Beecham
 The Good Humor Man (1950) as Johnny Bellew
 Trigger, Jr. (1950) as Larry Harkrider
 California Passage (1950) as Tommy Martin
 Quo Vadis (1951) as Nazarius
 At Sword's Point (1952) as Young Louis XIV

As screenwriter
 The Madmen of Mandoras (1963)
 They Saved Hitler's Brain (1968 TV movie, The Madmen of Mandoras with about 20 minutes of new footage)

References

Bibliography 
 Holmstrom, John. The Moving Picture Boy: An International Encyclopaedia from 1895 to 1995, Norwich, Michael Russell, 1996, p. 208.
 Best, Marc. Those Endearing Young Charms: Child Performers of the Screen (South Brunswick and New York: Barnes & Co., 1971), pp. 187–191.

External links
 

1938 births
2002 deaths
Male actors from California
American male child actors
American male film actors
American male television actors
American male screenwriters
American male novelists
20th-century American novelists
Deaths from cancer in California
American expatriates in Japan
20th-century American male writers
20th-century American male actors
20th-century American screenwriters